Alan Redway,  (born 11 March 1935) is a Canadian lawyer and former politician.

After a career in municipal politics culminating in the role of mayor of East York, a borough of Metropolitan Toronto, Redway entered federal politics. He was elected to the House of Commons of Canada in the 1984 election as the Progressive Conservative Member of Parliament for York East, now Don Valley East.

In 1989, he was appointed to the Cabinet of Prime Minister Brian Mulroney as Minister of State for Housing, including responsibility for the Canada Mortgage and Housing Corporation. Redway, a Red Tory and supporter of public investment in housing, was forced to resign from Cabinet in 1991 for contravening the Aeronautics Act by joking that his friend was carrying a gun while boarding a plane at Ottawa International Airport. He was defeated in the 1993 Canadian election that reduced the Tories to only two seats in the House of Commons.

Since leaving electoral politics, Redway has been involved in anti-poverty work with the Daily Bread Food Bank as a member of its board of directors from 1996 to 2004. In 2000, as co-chair of the group "Putting Housing Back on the Public Agenda", he addressed the Ontario legislature's Standing Committee on Finance and Economic Affairs, lobbying the Progressive Conservative Ontario government of Mike Harris against the selling off of public housing units and for increased investment for supportive housing .

Redway practised civil law in Toronto as a partner of the firm Redway & Butler LLP for many years. He retired in December 2010.

External links
 

1935 births
Living people
Members of the House of Commons of Canada from Ontario
Lawyers in Ontario
Canadian King's Counsel
Progressive Conservative Party of Canada MPs
Mayors of East York, Ontario
Metropolitan Toronto councillors
University of Toronto alumni
Members of the 24th Canadian Ministry